Craig County is the name of two counties in the United States: 

 Craig County, Oklahoma 
 Craig County, Virginia